Michal Tomco (born 11 January 1994) is a Slovak male BMX rider, representing his nation at international competitions. He competed in the time trial event at the 2015 UCI BMX World Championships.

References

External links
 
 

1994 births
Living people
BMX riders
Slovak male cyclists
European Games competitors for Slovakia
Cyclists at the 2015 European Games
Place of birth missing (living people)